The Inside may refer to:

The Inside (TV series), 2005 American crime drama television series
The Inside (album), an album by Zebra & Giraffe
The Inside, a 2007 album by Moses Mayfield
The Inside (film), 2012 Irish horror film by Eoin Macken

See also
Inside (disambiguation)
The Insider (disambiguation)